Calandrinia granulifera  is an annual herb in the family Montiaceae, and is native to  New South Wales, Tasmania, Western Australia, South Australia, and Victoria.

Description
It is a succulent, erect to decumbent herb, flowering from September to November with white-pink flowers. It grows on sandy and gravelly soils on granite outcrops and slopes.
The flowers are on pedicels (stems) which are 0.5–2 mm long and erect when in fruit. The bracts are alternate. The sepals are deciduous and 1.5–3 mm long. There are 5-7 petals, 5-10 stamens and 3 stigmas.
The black capsule is almost spherical with three short valves which open at the apex only. The numerous, red-brown, shiny seeds are about 0.5 mm long and 0.4 mm wide. For an illustration of the colliculate seeds, see PlantNet.

Taxonomy
Calandrinia granulifera was first described by George Bentham in 1863.

References

External links

Australasian Virtual Herbarium - Occurrence data for Calandrinia granulifera
VicFlora: Calandrinia granulifera. Royal Botanic Gardens Foundation Victoria

granulifera
Angiosperms of Western Australia
Flora of South Australia
Flora of New South Wales
Flora of Victoria (Australia)
Flora of Tasmania
Plants described in 1863
Taxa named by George Bentham